Azul, meaning "blue" in Spanish and Portuguese, may refer to:

Arts and entertainment
 Azul (Los Piojos album), 1998
 Azul (Cristian Castro album), 2001
 Azul Azul, a Bolivian pop-dance music group
 "Azul" (song), the title song
 "Azul", a song by J Balvin from Colores, 2020
 "Azul", a song by Zoé from Aztlán, 2018
 "Azul", a song by Natalia Lafourcade from Hu Hu Hu, 2009
 Azul for cello, obbligato group and orchestra, by composer Osvaldo Golijov, premiered 2006
 Azul (telenovela), starring Kate del Castillo and Patricia Reyes Spíndola
 Azul..., a poetry collection by Rubén Darío

Other
 Azul, Buenos Aires Province, a town in Argentina
 Operation Azul, the Argentine codename for the military landings that started the Falklands War
 Blue Division or División Azul, Spanish volunteers that served in the German Army in the Second World War
 Azul Systems, a software company, develops runtimes (JDKs, JVMs) for executing Java-based applications
 Azul Brazilian Airlines
 Air Azul, an American airline
 Azul (baseball), a Cuban baseball team
 Azul (board game), a 2017 tile laying game